Václav Jemelka (born 23 June 1995) is a Czech professional footballer who plays as a defender for Viktoria Plzeň.

Club career
He made his senior league debut in Sigma's Czech National Football League 2–0 win against Viktoria Žižkov on 30 September 2016. However, he had played in the same league in the previous season with the team's reserve squad. He scored his first senior goal in a controversial manner in Sigma's 1–1 draw at Slavia Prague on 10 September 2017, scoring the goal with his hand.

Career statistics

International

References

External links

Václav Jemelka profile on the SK Sigma Olomouc official website

Czech footballers
1995 births
Living people
People from Uničov
Czech Republic international footballers
Czech First League players
Belgian Pro League players
SK Sigma Olomouc players
Oud-Heverlee Leuven players
Expatriate footballers in Belgium
Czech expatriate sportspeople in Belgium
Association football defenders
FC Viktoria Plzeň players